Björn Sandro Runström (born 1 March 1984) is a Swedish former footballer who played as a striker.

Career

Early life 
Runström grew up in the southern suburbs of Stockholm and went to Enskede school as a child.

He started playing football for Enskede IK at the age of six years, Runström's time in Enskede went well and at the age of 12 years he was rewarded with a move to a bigger club; Hammarby IF. Runström developed at a fast speed and when he was 16 he left Hammarby for Italy and Bologna. He stayed in Italy for three years and led Bologna to their first Italian Youth Championship in 19 years in 2001.

Italy 
At 17 he was part of Bologna's first team but only made the bench in Serie A and Coppa Italia. In 2002, he was transferred to Chievo Verona and after that to Florentia Viola. His stay in Florence was not what he had dreamed of and when rumours spread in late 2003 that Fiorentina wanted to trade him for the Swedish international Kim Källström of Djurgårdens IF (one of former club Hammarby's biggest rivals) he was outraged and declared that it was a transfer he would never accept. "Me playing for Djurgården would be like Di Canio going back to Italy to play for A. S. Roma, it won't happen, if I go back to Sweden the only club that I could think of is my old club Hammarby".

Return to Hammarby IF 
Runström did return to Hammarby soon after and played three more seasons scoring 18 goals in 57 matches. This record attracted the attention of Premier League club Fulham (he had the chance to join the Cottagers in the January transfer window but declined saying "I didn't want to go on a free transfer in January even though I had an offer from Fulham already then, Hammarby have meant much to me and I wanted them to be well paid").

Fulham 
In July 2006, Runström joined Fulham on a three-year contract, for a fee of £700,000.

Loans 
After making just one Premier League appearance against Tottenham Hotspur, on 30 January 2007, Runström moved to Luton Town on loan for a month. He returned to Fulham on 1 April 2007, having scored twice for Luton, against Sheffield Wednesday and Norwich City. Later that year, in July, he was loaned out to German club 1. FC Kaiserslautern, for the 2007–08 season. On his return, in May 2008, Runström was released by Fulham.

OB 
On 4 June 2008, Runström signed a three-and-a-half-year contract with Danish club OB.

Loan to Molde 
On 23 February 2010, Molde FK signed the Swedish forward on loan from Danish club Odense BK until the end of the season. He made his competitive debut on the opening day of the Norwegian Premier League on 14 March against the defending champions Rosenborg. He scored on his debut, a 35-yard cracker in a 2–1 loss. After this match Runström spent the rest of the season mainly on the bench, only making brief appearances not succeeding in making a mark on the matches. Runström was towards the end of the season considered redundant in Molde and the club terminated the contract with the player and sent him back to Denmark.

Departure 
Runström and OB parted company in February 2011.

Second return to Hammarby IF 
On 27 February, Runström signed for The superettan side Hammarby, On 3 July, Runström scored twice against Öster.

MLS and retirement 
On 28 March 2012, Runström was signed to the New England Revolution of Major League Soccer. New England declined the option of his contract on 27 June 2012 and Runström became a free agent. He announced his retirement from professional football in early 2013.

References

External links
 Official Danish Superliga stats 
 
 

1984 births
Living people
Swedish footballers
Sweden youth international footballers
Sweden under-21 international footballers
Bologna F.C. 1909 players
A.C. ChievoVerona players
ACF Fiorentina players
Hammarby Fotboll players
Fulham F.C. players
Luton Town F.C. players
1. FC Kaiserslautern players
Odense Boldklub players
Molde FK players
New England Revolution players
Allsvenskan players
Serie C players
Premier League players
English Football League players
Danish Superliga players
2. Bundesliga players
Eliteserien players
Major League Soccer players
Swedish expatriate footballers
Expatriate men's footballers in Denmark
Expatriate footballers in England
Expatriate footballers in Germany
Expatriate footballers in Italy
Expatriate footballers in Norway
Expatriate soccer players in the United States
Association football forwards
Swedish expatriate sportspeople in Denmark
Swedish expatriate sportspeople in England
Swedish expatriate sportspeople in Germany
Swedish expatriate sportspeople in Italy
Swedish expatriate sportspeople in Norway
Swedish expatriate sportspeople in the United States
Footballers from Stockholm